A shelter is an architectural structure or natural formation providing protection from the environment

Shelter may also refer to:

Places 
 Port Shelter, Hong Kong
 Shelter Bay (disambiguation), various locations
 Shelter Cove (disambiguation), various locations
 Shelter Island (disambiguation), various locations
 Shelter Point, South Georgia Island

Arts, entertainment, and media

Films
 Shelter (1937, 1955, 1979), Encyclopædia Britannica education shorts - see List of Encyclopædia Britannica Films titles
 Shelter, a 1998 film starring John Allen Nelson
 Shelter (2007 film), by Jonah Markowitz
 Shelter (2010 film), directed by Måns Mårlind and Björn Stein
 Shelter (2012 film), directed by Adam Caudill and Wrion Bowling
 Shelter (2014 film), written and directed by Paul Bettany
 Shelter, a 2016 short film produced by A-1 Pictures
 Shelter, a 2017 film produced by Eran Riklis

Literature
 Shelter, a 1941 novel by Marguerite Steen
 Shelter, a 1999 novel by Chaz Brenchley
 Shelter, a 2007 novel by Susan Palwick
 Shelter (novel), a 2011 novel by Harlan Coben

Music

Groups and labels
 Shelter (band), an American Krishnacore band (1991-2018)
 Shelter Records, an American record label (1969–1981)

Albums  
 Shelter (Lone Justice album), 1986
 Shelter (Brand New Heavies album), 1997
 Shelter (Alcest album), 2014
 Shelter (Olivia Chaney album), 2018
 Shelter (soundtrack), a 2008 album from the eponymous 2007 movie
 Shelter, a 2003 album by Rasa
 Shelter, a 2013 album by Ghost Mice and Ramshackle Glory

Songs 
 "Shelter" (The xx song), 2011
 "Shelter" (Porter Robinson and Madeon song), 2016
 "Shelter" (Finneas song), 2019

 "Shelter", a song from the album Sounding a Mosaic by Bedouin Soundclash
 "Shelter", a song from The Eye of Every Storm by Neurosis
 "Shelter", a song from You Are Here by thenewno2
 "Shelter", a song from Trouble by Ray LaMontagne
 "Shelter", a song from The Shelter by Jars of Clay

Other uses in arts, entertainment, and media
Shelter (video game), a 2013 video game
"The Shelter" (The Twilight Zone), an episode of the television series

Other uses 
 Shelter (automobile), a Dutch experimental city car of the 1950s
 Shelter (charity), a UK charitable organisation
 USS Shelter (AM-301), an American minesweeper

See also
 Animal shelter, a place where homeless, lost, or abandoned animals, mostly dogs and cats, are housed
 Homeless shelter, a place providing food and accommodation for the homeless
 Women's shelter, a refuge for women escaping domestic violence and intimate partner violence 
 Shelter rule, a doctrine in the common law of property
 The Shelter (disambiguation)